Shelby Alexander Martínez Samperio (born December 30, 1996, in Mexico City) is a professional Mexican footballer who last played for Club de Ciervos

References

External links
 
Shelby Martinez at Atlante F.C. Profile 

1996 births
Living people
Mexican footballers
Association football midfielders
Pioneros de Cancún footballers
Atlante F.C. footballers
Club de Ciervos F.C. footballers
Ascenso MX players
Liga Premier de México players
Tercera División de México players
Footballers from Mexico City